The 2000 Chevrolet Cup was an ATP men's tennis tournament held on outdoor clay courts in Santiago, Chile that was part of the International Series category of the 2000 ATP Tour. It was the seventh edition of the tournament and was held from 28 February until 6 March 2000. First-seeded Gustavo Kuerten won the singles title.

Finals

Singles

 Gustavo Kuerten defeated  Mariano Puerta 7–6(7–3), 6–3
 It was Kuerten's 2nd title of the year and the 13th of his career.

Doubles

 Gustavo Kuerten /  Antonio Prieto defeated  Lan Bale /  Piet Norval 6–2, 6–4
 It was Kuerten's 1st title of the year and the 12th of his career. It was Prieto's only title of the year and the 1st of his career.

References

External links
 ITF tournament edition details

Chile Open (tennis)
Movistar Open
Movistar Open